A Captured Moment in Time is the fourth album by Canadian rapper and producer DL Incognito. The album was nominated for Rap Recording of the Year at the 2009 Juno Awards.

The artwork for the CD cover is designed by Taktikal Design.

Track listing

References 

2008 albums
DL Incognito albums